Calamaria yunnanensis is a species of snake of the family Colubridae. It is commonly known as the Yunnan reed snake.

Geographic range
The Yunnan reed snake is found in China, where it is known only from the Wuliang Mountains of central Yunnan (Jingdong and Nanjian counties).

References 

Reptiles described in 1962
Reptiles of China
Colubrids
Calamaria
Endangered Fauna of China